Barry Jouannet, Jr. (born 17 September 1979) is a former Australian professional darts player who plays in British Darts Organisation (BDO) events. He was nicknamed China.

Jouannet is twice a winner of the Oceanic Masters, earning himself a place in the PDC World Darts Championship. In 2004, he lost in the first round to Scotland's Alex MacKay. In 2005, he lost again in round one, this time to Wayne Jones. Aside from the Oceanic Masters, Jouannet won the 2005 Australian National Championship, beating former world champion Tony David on the way to a 6–1 win over Dave Methven in the final.

Jouannet has survived throat cancer. Jouannet continued playing despite the illness and his recovery has been praised by many within the game.

World Championship results

PDC
 2004: Last 48: (lost to Alex MacKay 2–3) (sets) 
 2005: Last 48: (lost to Wayne Jones 0–3)

References

External links
 Story about Barry Jouannet
 Stats on Darts Database

1979 births
Australian darts players
Living people
Professional Darts Corporation associate players
Sportspeople from Wollongong